The 1908 Copa de Honor Cousenier was the final match to decide the winner of the Copa de Honor Cousenier, the 4th. edition of the international competition organised by the Argentine and Uruguayan Associations together. The final was contested by Uruguayan side Wanderers and Argentine team Quilmes. 

The match was held in the Estadio Gran Parque Central in Montevideo, on October 11, 1908. Wanderers beat Quilmes 2–0, winning its first Copa Cousenier trophy.

Qualified teams 

Note

Match details 

|

|}

References

C
1908 in Argentine football
1908 in Uruguayan football